The 2007 Danish Cup Final were the final and deciding match of the 2006–07 Danish Cup. It took place on Thursday 17 May 2007 at Parken Stadium in Copenhagen. The contesting teams were the Danish Superliga 2006-07 leaders, F.C. Copenhagen, and the current no. 2 in the league, Odense Boldklub.

F.C. Copenhagen have won the Cup on three previous occasions (1995, 1997 and 2004). OB have won the Cup four times, in 1983, 1991, 1993 and in 2002 where they beat FCK in the final.

Route to the final

Copenhagen
In all results below, the score of the finalist is given first.

Odense
In all results below, the score of the finalist is given first.

Match details

See also
Danish Cup 2006-07 for details of the current competition.

External links
 Match facts at F.C. Copenhagen 
 Match facts at Odense BK 
 Match facts at Haslund.info 

Danish Cup Finals
Danish Cup Final 2007
Danish Cup Final 2007
Cup
May 2007 sports events in Europe
Sports competitions in Copenhagen
2007 in Copenhagen